The 8th National Congress of the Chinese Communist Party was held in two sessions, the first 15–27 September 1956 and the second 5–23 May 1958 in Beijing. It was the first Congress of the Chinese Communist Party since the start of it taking full control of mainland China in 1949 and establishing the People's Republic of China. It was preceded by the relatively early 7th National Congress. It was formally succeeded by the 9th National Congress. The Great Hall of the People was not yet constructed, so it was held in the National Political Consultative Conference Hall.

Legislation 
The Great Leap Forward was promulgated and unilaterally put in effect.

Representatives
 Delegates: 1,026
 Alternate delegates: 86
 Represented party members: 10,730,000

Significance
The 8th National Congress was the first Congress to be held in 11 years, and the first Congress since the establishment of the People's Republic of China. Mao Zedong Thought was taken out of the Constitution of the Chinese Communist Party and the cult of personality was denounced; Party technocrats Liu Shaoqi and Deng Xiaoping assume higher profiles. The 8th Central Committee of the Chinese Communist Party was elected.

See also 

 Qualification Review Committee of the 8th National Congress of the Chinese Communist Party

External links 
The 8th National Congress

1956 conferences
1956 in China
National Congress of the Chinese Communist Party
8th National Congress of the Chinese Communist Party